Rajkumar Hirani (born 20 November 1962) is an Indian film director and editor. Hirani is known for directing the Hindi films Munna Bhai M.B.B.S (2003), Lage Raho Munnabhai (2006), 3 Idiots (2009), PK (2014) and Sanju (2018). All of his films have been huge commercial and critical successes. Most have won several awards, including the national awards. He has won 11 Filmfare Awards. He is the founder of production house Rajkumar Hirani Films.

National Film Awards

Filmfare Awards 
Hirani's all directorial features have been nominated for Filmfare Award for Best Film and Best Director for him so far, making him the only director to do so. Also his all films are nominated for Best screenplay barring Sanju.

Screen Awards

IIFA Awards

Apsara Awards

Zee Cine Awards

Bollywood Movie Awards

Stardust Awards

Global Indian Film Awards

ETC Bollywood Business Awards

Indian Film Festival of Melbourne

CNN-IBN Indian of the Year

See also
 List of accolades received by Lage Raho Munna Bhai
 List of accolades received by 3 Idiots

References

External links
 

Lists of awards received by Indian film director